Peter Buur Steffensen (born 4 December 1979) is a retired Danish badminton player.

Career 
Steffensen was born and raised in a town in western Jutland near Herning. He has lived in Copenhagen since 2001 and has a professional academic background in Pedagogy. As a player, Peter was playing professionally from 2001 to 2009 on the Danish National Badminton Team, where he played doubles alongside Jonas Rasmussen, Mathias Boe and Thomas Laybourn winning several international titles in Europe in Sweden, Greece and the Netherlands. He won two Danish youth titles in 2001, including the Croatia International. In 2002 he won at the Iceland International and the 2003 Dutch International. In 2005 he represented Denmark at the IBF World Championships in the United States. In 2006 he was successful at the International in Italy, Bulgaria and Finland, managing to position itself as number 10 in the world. In 2008 he won at the Swedish International in Stockholm. He currently serves as a Coach for several of the Danish Badminton clubs, having training experience at Lillerød and KBK Copenhagen, where he served as the Senior Head Coach for the first division.

Achievements

IBF Grand Prix 
The World Badminton Grand Prix sanctioned by International Badminton Federation (IBF) from 1983 to 2006.

Men's doubles

Mixed doubles

IBF International 
Men's doubles

Mixed doubles

 BWF International Challenge tournament
 BWF/IBF International Series tournament
 BWF Future Series tournament

References 

1979 births
Living people
Danish male badminton players